The 16th FINA World Junior Artistic Swimming Championships was held from 18 to 22 July 2018 at Danube Arena in Budapest, Hungary. It was the first World Junior Championships following the renaming of the sport from synchronized swimming to artistic swimming to reflect the incorporation of evaluation criteria emphasizing choreography and artistic expression, in addition to synchronization, and was the first to use the name World Junior Artistic Swimming Championships at the time of competition.

This 2018 edition also marked the first time men were allowed to compete at any edition of the Championships, with a mixed gender duet debuted that featured one male and one female swimmer per duo.

Results

Women

Mixed

Medal table

References

External links
 Results

FINA World Junior Synchronised Swimming Championships
2018 in synchronized swimming
Synchronised swimming in Hungary
July 2018 sports events in Europe
2018 in Hungarian sport
2010s in Budapest